Hong Kong competed at the 2018 Winter Olympics in Pyeongchang, South Korea, from 9 to 25 February 2018. Hong Kong's team consisted of one female alpine skier, Arabella Ng.

Competitors
The following is the list of number of competitors participating in the Hong Kong delegation per sport.

Alpine skiing 

Hong Kong qualified one female athlete, Arabella Ng. Hong Kong made its debut in the sport at the Winter Olympics, as it has only competed in short track speed skating at its first four appearances.

See also
Hong Kong at the 2017 Asian Winter Games
Hong Kong at the 2018 Summer Youth Olympics

References

Nations at the 2018 Winter Olympics
2018
2018 in Hong Kong sport